Methylorosula polaris is a Gram-negative, aerobic, facultatively methylotrophic, psychrotolerant and motile bacteria from the genus of Methylorosula with bipolar flagella which has been isolated from tundra wetland soil in Vorkuta in Russia.

References

Beijerinckiaceae
Bacteria described in 2012
Psychrophiles